John Franklin Fort (March 20, 1852 – November 17, 1920) was an American Republican Party politician, who served as the 33rd governor of New Jersey, from 1908 to 1911. His uncle, George Franklin Fort, was a Democratic Governor of New Jersey from 1851 to 1854.

Biography
Fort was born in Pemberton, New Jersey on March 20, 1852. He attended the Pennington Seminary, and earned an LL.B. degree at Albany Law School in 1872.

An attorney, Fort was appointed by Governor George B. McClellan, a Democrat, to the First District Court of Newark, a position he held through subsequent Democratic administrations until he stepped down in 1886. Fort was a delegate to the Republican National Convention in 1884 and 1896. In 1900, Governor Foster M. Voorhees appointed him to the New Jersey Supreme Court, where he remained until 1907. Fort was a delegate to the 1912 Republican National Convention.

In 1909 Fort was elected an honorary member of the New Jersey Society of the Cincinnati.

In March 1917, President (and former New Jersey Governor) Woodrow Wilson appointed Fort to the Federal Trade Commission, a position he held until November 1919 when he resigned due to illness. He died in his South Orange home on November 17, 1920, aged 68, and was buried at Bloomfield Cemetery in Bloomfield.

See also
List of governors of New Jersey

References

External links
Biography of John Franklin Fort (PDF), New Jersey State Library
New Jersey John Franklin Fort, National Governors Association
Dead Governors of New Jersey bio for John Franklin Fort
Dead Governors information for John Franklin Fort
Political Graveyard info for John Franklin Fort

1852 births
1920 deaths
Republican Party governors of New Jersey
Albany Law School alumni
New Jersey lawyers
New Jersey state court judges
Justices of the Supreme Court of New Jersey
People from Pemberton, New Jersey
People from South Orange, New Jersey
Burials in New Jersey
The Pennington School alumni
Federal Trade Commission personnel
Woodrow Wilson administration personnel